Viveiros is a surname. Notable people with the surname include:

Camilo Viveiros
Craig Viveiros
Eduardo Viveiros de Castro (born 1951), Brazilian anthropologist
Emanuel Viveiros (born 1966), Canadian ice hockey player
Hugo Viveiros
Mateus Viveiros
Nuno Viveiros (born 1983), Portuguese footballer

See also
Bernie DeViveiros

Portuguese-language surnames